George Taliaferro (January 8, 1927 – October 8, 2018) was a professional American football player who was the first African American drafted by a National Football League (NFL) team.  Beginning his football career at Indiana University for the Hoosiers team, he played in the NFL for the New York Yanks from 1950 to 1951, the Dallas Texans in 1952, the Baltimore Colts from 1953 to 1954, and Philadelphia Eagles in 1955. Taliaferro was inducted into the College Football Hall of Fame in 1981.

Early life
Taliaferro was born in Gates, Tennessee. Before his college years, he moved to Gary, Indiana, where he graduated from Gary Roosevelt High School.

Career

College football
He would play a variety of positions for Indiana University in Bloomington, Indiana from 1945 to 1948 as halfback, quarterback, defensive back, and kicker. He struggled with prejudice of the time during his studies at Indiana that ranged from being barred from living in the dormitories to conflicting attitudes from teammates about his treatment on and off the field. While at Indiana University, Taliaferro became a member of Kappa Alpha Psi fraternity.

As the leading rusher and an All-American at Indiana University, he led the Hoosiers team to their only undefeated Big Ten Conference championship during his rookie year in 1945, and he led the conference in rushing (a first for an African American in the Big Ten) with 719 yards on 156 carries; he started his college career with 95 yards on 20 carries against Michigan as left halfback. He was a three-time All-American, Taliaferro led the Hoosiers in rushing twice, punting in 1945 and passing in 1948. Taliaferro helped break the color barrier in sports, playing for the Hoosiers two years before Jackie Robinson suited up for the Brooklyn Dodgers. He was inducted into the College Football Hall of Fame in 1981.

National Football League (NFL)
Taliaferro, a halfback, quarterback, and punter, was picked by the Chicago Bears in the thirteenth round of the 1949 NFL Draft but instead chose to play for the Los Angeles Dons of the All-America Football Conference. This made him the first African American drafted by an NFL team.

Playing in the last season of the AAFC, Taliaferro would play in eleven of the twelve games played by the team with four starts. He would run 95 times for 472 yards with five touchdowns on the running side; in passing, he went 45-of-124 for 790 yards with four touchdowns to 14 interceptions; he also punted 27 times for 982 yards while being blocked twice. He also made 15 combined kick and punt returns for 366 total yards and one touchdown. He was named to the 2nd Team of the All-AAFC Team by the league and various press sources.

When the league was disassembled, he moved to the NFL in 1950, playing with the New York Yanks. Playing at halfback for the Yanks, Taliaferro started each game of the season for the team. He rushed 88 times for 411 yards with four touchdowns while catching 21 passes for 299 yards and five touchdowns. He also threw seven passes and completed three for a touchdown and 83 yards while making 34 combined returns on punt and kicks for over 500 yards (he was also plagued with 11 fumbles with five recoveries). For the team, he led the team in rushing and receiving touchdowns while being on a 7-5 team. In his seven seasons played professionally, it would be the only time he was on a team with a winning record.

Taliaferro and the Yanks were derailed by erratic circumstances for 1951, in which they had just four home games due to the tenants of Yankee Stadium forcing them out in the opening weeks of the season. The result was a crash with just one win. However, Taliaferro would have his first of two 100-yard rushing performances during the season. He ran 12 times for 166 yards for two touchdowns while throwing 3-of-5 for 83 yards with a touchdown pass to provide all the points in a 48–21 loss to the Los Angeles Rams. For his part, Taliaferro would run 62 yards for 330 yards with three touchdowns while catching 16 passes for 230 yards for two touchdowns while passing 13-of-33 for 251 yards and one touchdown to three interceptions. He also punted 76 times for 2,881 yards with one blocked kick. He also returned a league high 27 kicks for 622 yards. He also caught four interceptions for 74 yards - it is the only season where he recorded an interception.  He was named to the Pro Bowl that season alongside teammates Mike McCormack and Brad Ecklund. After the Yanks went under, a Dallas-based group acquired the assets of the team and moved them to Dallas.

For the 1952 season, it would be the only one for the team in Dallas, and it equally proved a disaster in terms of wins for Taliaferro and company, as the team didn't even finish the season in their home city and won just one game. For Taliaferro's part, he still managed to thrive in his own ways. He rushed 100 times for 419 yards with one touchdown while catching 21 passes for 244 yards and one touchdown. He also threw 16-of-63 for 298 combined yards with two touchdown to six interceptions. He also had seven combined punt and kick returns for 150 yards. He ended up named to the 1953 Pro Bowl alongside his teammate John Wozniak while having a 2nd Team award from the Associated Press.

The 1953 season was Taliaferro's third in three seasons, as the ashes of the Dallas franchise were picked up for a team in Baltimore. He would play in eleven games and rush for career highs in 102 carries for 479 yards while having two touchdowns and 20 catches for 346 yards for two touchdowns. He would also make appearances at quarterback, mostly during the latter part of a seven-game losing streak to end the season, with most of his passes (15-of-55 for 211 yards) coming there, and he threw two touchdowns to five interceptions. He had his second and last 100-yard rushing game on November 22, running for 136 yards on sixteen carries for one touchdown in a 21–13 loss to the Rams. He made his final appearance at punting, doing 65 kicks for 2,437 yards. He made 26 combined returns for 362 yards. For the third and last time, he finished in the top ten in rushing yards in the league alongside rushing yards per game.  He also led the league in fumbles, however, with ten. Alongside teammates Art Donovan, Dick Barwegen, and Tom Keane, he was named to the 1954 Pro Bowl for his third and last selection. 1954 represented his last full season. He started in nine games that year while running 48 times for 157 yards with no touchdowns. He also caught 14 passes for 122 yards and one touchdown while throwing two passes for one interception.

Taliaferro moved on to the Philadelphia Eagles the following year. He made brief appearances in three games and rushed three times for -2 yards while making three catches for 17 yards.

Personal life
A documentary about Taliaferro, titled Indiana Legends: George Taliaferro, was produced by WTIU public television in Bloomington, Indiana. In later years he became a volunteer with Big Brothers Big Sisters of Baltimore, advised prisoners adjusting to society upon their release, got his master's in social work at Howard University, taught at Maryland, was dean of students at Morgan State, returned to Indiana as a professor and special assistant to IU president John Ryan, and helped start Big Brothers Big Sisters of South Central Indiana in Bloomington.   In 1972, George moved to Bloomington with his wife Viola and their four children. In the fall of 1975, Viola entered the Indiana University School of Law and obtained a doctorate in law in 1977, and began private practice in family and criminal law. In 1989, Ms. Taliaferro was appointed as a judge of the Monroe Circuit Court. In 1995, she was appointed as a judge of the Seventh Court of the Monroe Circuit. Viola Taliaferro retired in 2004. George remained a sports fan as well as an avid golfer throughout his days at Indiana University as well his retirement.

Death
Taliaferro died at age 91 on October 8, 2018, in Mason, Ohio, from heart failure having left his longtime home of Bloomington, Indiana, a year earlier.

See also
 Racial issues faced by black quarterbacks

References

Further reading
Knight, Dawn (2019). Race and Football in America: The Life and Legacy of George Taliaferro. Indiana University Press. 
Piascik, Andy (2009). Gridiron Gauntlet. Lanham, MD: Taylor Trade Publishing.

External links
 "Indiana Legends: George Taliaferro", Indiana University

1927 births
2018 deaths
African-American players of American football
American football halfbacks
American football quarterbacks
Baltimore Colts players
College Football Hall of Fame inductees
Dallas Texans (NFL) players
Indiana Hoosiers football players
Los Angeles Dons players
New York Yanks players
People from Lauderdale County, Tennessee
Philadelphia Eagles players
Players of American football from Gary, Indiana
Players of American football from Tennessee
Western Conference Pro Bowl players
20th-century African-American sportspeople
21st-century African-American people
Howard University alumni
University System of Maryland faculty
Morgan State University faculty
Indiana University faculty